The Korn Ferry Challenge at TPC Sawgrass was a golf tournament on the Korn Ferry Tour. The tournament was one of several added to the Korn Ferry Tour schedule as part of adjustments due to the COVID-19 pandemic and was the first event played after the tour took a three-month hiatus due to the pandemic. It was played in June 2020 on the Dye's Valley Course at TPC Sawgrass in Ponte Vedra Beach, Florida; the course had previously hosted the Winn-Dixie Jacksonville Open from 2010 to 2012 and the Web.com Tour Championship from 2013 to 2015. Luke List won the tournament by one stroke over Joseph Bramlett and Shad Tuten.

Winners

References

External links
Coverage on the Korn Ferry Tour's official site

Former Korn Ferry Tour events
Golf in Florida
Recurring sporting events established in 2020
Recurring sporting events disestablished in 2020
2020 establishments in Florida
2020 disestablishments in Florida